is an anime television series produced by Sunrise and directed by Keiichi Satou. The screenplay was written by Masafumi Nishida, with original character design by Masakazu Katsura. It is set in a futuristic city where heroes fight crime whilst promoting real life sponsors, focusing on two superheroes, the old-fashioned Kotetsu T. "Wild Tiger" Kaburagi and the rookie hero Barnaby "Bunny" Brooks Jr., as they are forced by their employers to work together.

The series aired on Tokyo MX between April 3, 2011 and September 18, 2011, also receiving simulcasts by Viz Media on Hulu and Anime News Network. An English-language version by Viz Media began broadcasting on the Neon Alley video service from October 2, 2012. A film adaptation, Tiger & Bunny: The Beginning, was released on September 22, 2012.

On March 30, 2019, Nikkan Sports announced that a sequel to the original Tiger & Bunny series is currently in production. On April 2, 2020, the sequel was announced as Tiger & Bunny 2. Voice actors Hiroaki Hirata and Masakazu Morita are returning to voice their respective characters. The anime is being produced by studio Bandai Namco Pictures, with director Mitsuko Kase replacing director Keiichi Satou. The character designs will be created by manga artist Masakazu Katsura.  The sequel will also have 25 episodes, split into two cours. Its first 13 episodes premiered on April 8, 2022 on Netflix.

The series uses two pieces of opening theme music and two pieces of ending music. From episode fourteen onwards, the opening is "Missing Link" by Novels and the ending is "Mind Game" by Tamaki. For the second movie the opening theme is "Nemesis" by Novels whilst the ending theme is "Harmonized Finale" by Unison Square Garden.

Series overview

Episode list

Season 1 (2011)

Season 2 (2022)

Films
A film adaptation of the series, Tiger & Bunny: The Beginning, was released in Japanese theatres on September 22, 2012, featuring a reprisal of the events of the TV series alongside an original story.

Home media release

References

External links
 
 

Tiger and Bunny